Bug Out is an American television documentary series investigating a heist of rare live insects at the Philadelphia Insectarium & Butterfly Pavilion. It premiered on IMDb TV on March 4, 2022.

Summary
The docuseries tells the story of the unsolved heist of $50,000 worth of rare live insects from the Philadelphia Insectarium & Butterfly Pavilion, the first bug zoo in the United States. It explores the underworld of exotic bug smugglers, and the Federal agents who pursue them, focusing on the day in August 2018 when the head of the museum, John Cambridge, arrived at work and realized some 7,000 live bugs had been stolen. It was the biggest insect heist on record, with many of the missing bugs rare, large, or deadly, including scorpions, tarantulas, rhinoceros cockroaches, and a six-eyed sand spider.

Series creator Ben Feldman was working as a lawyer in Philadelphia when he heard about the heist. The series evolved from the 2019 documentary Flea Market, which examined the same subject and was also directed by Feldman.

Cast
 John Cambridge
 Steve Kanya
 Kevin Wiley
 Wlodek Lapkiewicz
 Michael Kinzler
 Chris Tomasetto
 Alison Mumper

Episodes

Release
The trailer was released on January 25, 2022. The four-part series premiered on IMDb TV on March 4, 2022.

References

External links 
 

English-language television shows
2022 American television series debuts
Documentary television series about crime in the United States
Television series about insects